Kingstanding is an area in north Birmingham, England.  It gives its name to a ward in the Erdington council constituency. Kingstanding ward includes the areas; Perry Common, Witton Lakes. The other part of Kingstanding falls under the Oscott ward.

Kingstanding houses a covered drinking water reservoir, Perry Barr Reservoir, on the site of the former Perry Barr Farm.

Kingstanding is served by two libraries; Kingstanding Library and Perry Common Library.

The area known as Kingstanding Circle is where the Kingstanding village centre lies with its shops and Kings Road/ Kingstanding Road roundabout.

History
The name of the area is derived from the occasion when the Stuart King Charles I supposedly reviewed his troops standing on the Neolithic Bowl Barrow in the area on 18 October 1642 during the English Civil War, after his stay at nearby Aston Hall. The first references to Kingstanding were as King's Standing.

The course of the Icknield Street Roman Road runs past this barrow; and when the foundations for the water pumping station were being dug in 1884, a hoard of Roman coins was discovered.

The area was largely rural until 1928, when large-scale residential development commenced in the area. The first of the estates was completed in 1934. It was during the 1930s and 1940s that most of the current housing was built. Most of the houses in Kingstanding were built as council houses  in the north of the area. At the time, it was the largest council housing development in Europe, containing some 6,700 properties on its completion.

In 1935, an Odeon cinema, designed by Cecil Clavering, was opened on Kingstanding Circle. On 6 June 1964, Kingstanding Library opened.

Kingstanding is featured in the novel The Last Viking by Dr Ron Dawson. The author grew up at number 79 Parkeston Crescent, and used the estate and its many characters as the backcloth to his Birmingham-based novel.

2022 explosion

On 26 June 2022 at around 20:30 BST, a suspected gas explosion occurred on Dulwich Road. It killed one woman and injured five others, one of which was in life-threatening condition. The exact cause of the explosion is currently unknown.

Politics
The Kingstanding ward was the scene of political controversy in May 2006 when it initially appeared its voters had elected a British National Party candidate, Sharon Ebanks, to Birmingham City Council – the first BNP candidate ever to be elected in Birmingham. However, it was announced by the Returning Officer shortly after the declaration that a counting error had taken place and, following a High Court recount, Ebanks was removed as Councillor on 26 July 2006 and replaced by Labour candidate Catherine Grundy. In 2014 Conservative Gary Sambrook defeated Labour in a by-election, caused by the resignation of Catharine Grundy. In the 2014 local elections Ron Storer also won the seat for the Conservatives from Labour, in what was once a safe Labour seat.

Kingstanding is part of the Birmingham Erdington parliamentary constituency. The current Member of Parliament is Paulette Hamilton of the Labour Party, who was first elected in a by-election in March 2022 following the death of the previous Labour MP Jack Dromey.

World War II
A number of bombs were dropped on the then new Kingstanding housing estate during World War II. On 25 August 1940, four people including a three-year-old boy were killed when a bomb hit a house in Kingstanding Road, while a bomb in Oundle Road killed a 27-year-old man and a third bomb in Hurlingham Road killed a 61-year-old woman.

Population
Kingstanding ward had a population 25,702 at the time of the 2001 Population Census. It has a population density of 5,410 people per km2 compared with 3,649 people per km2 for Birmingham. Ethnic minorities make up 10.6% (2,724) of the ward's population as opposed to 29.6% for Birmingham as a whole.

Notable residents
 Dr Ron Dawson. Educationist, researcher and author lived in Parkeston Crescent, attended Twickenham Road School, 1945–1951.
 Lloyd Dyer, retired professional footballer who played for the likes of Birmingham City, LeicesterCity and West Bromwich Albion, attended Cardinal Wiseman School between 1994 and 1999
 Alison Hammond, actor and television presenter
 Steve Winwood, rock musician

See also

Kingstanding Baths

References

External links

Birmingham City Council: Kingstanding Ward

 
Areas of Birmingham, West Midlands
Wards of Birmingham, West Midlands
Erdington